Gymnosoma maxima is a species of tachinid flies in the genus Gymnosoma of the family Tachinidae.

References

Phasiinae
Diptera of Asia
Insects described in 1966